Upper Oakhurst Historic District is a national historic district  located at Bluefield, Mercer County, West Virginia.  The district includes 37 contributing buildings in a residential area adjacent to South Bluefield. The buildings are primarily large single-family residences on large lots.  The properties were mostly developed during the 1920s, and are representative of popular architectural styles, including Colonial Revival and Classical Revival.  A number of the homes were designed by architect Alex B. Mahood.

It was listed on the National Register of Historic Places in 1992.

References

American Craftsman architecture in West Virginia
Bungalow architecture in West Virginia
Neoclassical architecture in West Virginia
Colonial Revival architecture in West Virginia
National Register of Historic Places in Mercer County, West Virginia
Historic districts in Bluefield, West Virginia
Historic districts on the National Register of Historic Places in West Virginia